Cystostereum is a genus of crust fungi in the family Cystostereaceae. The generic name combines the Greek word  ("bladder") with Stereum.

Species
Cystostereum australe Nakasone (1983) – Southeastern USA; Costa Rica
Cystostereum heteromorphum Hallenb. (1980) – Iran
Cystostereum kenyense Hjortstam (1987) – Kenya
Cystostereum murrayi (Berk. & M.A.Curtis) Pouzar (1959)
Cystostereum pini-canadense (Schwein.) Parmasto (1968)
Cystostereum saxitas (Burt) A.L.Welden (2010)
Cystostereum stratosum Hallenb. (1978) – Iran; India

References

Cystostereaceae
Polyporales genera
Taxa described in 1959